The Rwandan records in swimming are the fastest ever performances of swimmers from Rwanda, which are recognised and ratified by the Fedaration Rwandaise de Natation Amateur.

All records were set in finals unless noted otherwise.

Long Course (50 m)

Men

Women

Short Course (25 m)

Men

Women

References

Rwanda
Records
Swimming
Swimming